"Headed for a Heartache" is a song written by Kent Blazy and James Dowell, and recorded by American country music artist Gary Morris.  It was released in August 1981 as the first single from the album Gary Morris.  The song reached number 8 on the Billboard Hot Country Singles & Tracks chart.

Chart performance

References

1981 singles
Gary Morris songs
Songs written by Kent Blazy
Song recordings produced by Paul Worley
Warner Records singles
1981 songs